R.E.M. Beauty (stylized as r.e.m. beauty) is a cosmetics brand by Ariana Grande, that was launched on November 12, 2021.

History 
In August 2021, several billboards have appeared across Times Square in New York City, saying "r.e.m. coming soon." The pop singer and actress later revealed that her beauty line "is officially on its way". Grande officially launched her cosmetic company on November 12, 2021. Her first collection is named: Chapter 1: Ultraviolet. The company's name is inspired by one of Grande's songs, "R.E.M.", where it was released in 2018.

After their launch, many of their cosmetic products were distributed throughout Ulta Beauty stores, as of March 2022. Forbes reported that R.E.M. Beauty was one of the brands boosting Ulta's driving gross margin due to strong consumer demand.

In January 2023, Forbes announced that Grande is set to acquire the physical assets for the brand, for an estimated $15 million from Forma Brands—the parent company of Morphe Cosmetics—after the company filed for bankruptcy earlier that month, ending their licensing agreement.

The cosmetics company "named a new chief executive officer, Michelle Shigemasa."

Products 
Chapter 1: Ultraviolet line featured 12 core products, including a range of individual shades, for both lips and eyes. In March 2022, Grande released the brand's Chapter 2: Goodnight and Go line. In addition to a selection of new skincare products—an under-eye balm, lash and brow serum, and face mist—the collection also contained makeup staples such as versatile cheek and lipstick and additional sets of eyelash extensions. She then released Chapter 3: On Your Collar, which included various lip products, and Chapter 4: Out Of Body, which included a concealer available in 60 different shades.

Awards 
In May 2022, the cosmetic company won the award for "Best New Brand" at the Readers' Choice Awards from Allure, with Flourishing Lengthening Mascara being awarded for "Best Mascara (Length)" in the category of "Best Eye Makeup" of 2022 at its annual Best of Beauty Awards.

Notes

References

External links 
 

Cosmetics brands
Ariana Grande
Organizations established in 2021